George Sheehy Stults (born August 16, 1975) is an American actor and former fashion model. Stults is best known for his role as Kevin Kinkirk on the long-running family drama series 7th Heaven.

Life and career
Stults was born in Detroit, Michigan, and grew up in Green Mountain Falls, Colorado. His younger brother is actor Geoff Stults. He received a wrestling scholarship at the University of Southern Colorado (now Colorado State University Pueblo), but he transferred to Whittier College in his junior year to be closer to his brother.

Stults was interested in acting and wrestling in high school. He got his career start as a model. A commercial agent spotted Stults eating lunch one day and stopped to give him her card and he then entered into the world of acting. At the time, Stults seriously considered joining the U.S. Navy. In February 2001 Stults made his first television appearance, outside of commercials, in a minor guest role on an episode of Will & Grace, and a short time later he made a guest appearance on a season 7 episode of Friends, The One With Joey's New Brain as Jessica Lockhart's daughter's boyfriend.

George auditioned for a role on 7th Heaven where his brother Geoff already had a recurring role as Mary Camden's love interest Ben Kinkirk. Originally auditioning for the role of a kid who forces people to drink, George was later cast in the role of Ben's older brother Kevin. Stults remained a regular cast member of 7th Heaven from season 6 until the final season 11, appearing in a total of 114 episodes.

Stults appeared in television and print ads for Liz Claiborne's fragrance "Bora Bora" in 2002. He has appeared in the "Spirit of a Boy, Wisdom of a Man" music video by Randy Travis. He appeared in K-Mart commercials with many other WB stars (2004). He starred in the film Night Skies in 2007. He starred in the 2010 psychological thriller Necrosis alongside James Kyson Lee and Tiffany.

In the mid-2010s, Stults began starring in television movies, mostly as the male lead in romantic Christmas-themed films.

Filmography

Film

Television

References

External links
https://www.imdb.com/name/nm1169471/

George Stults cast bio on The CW

1975 births
21st-century American male actors
Living people
Male models from Colorado
American male sport wrestlers
American male television actors
Colorado State University Pueblo alumni
Whittier College alumni
Male actors from Colorado
Male actors from Detroit
People from Green Mountain Falls, Colorado
Male models from Michigan